Burning Up the Night is the sixth and final studio album by Australian group Flash and the Pan, released in 1992.

Track listing
All songs written by Harry Vanda and George Young.

Personnel

Production
 Harry Vanda – Producer
 George Young – Producer
 Sam Horsburgh Jnr. – Engineer
 Bruce Brown – Mix Engineer
 Steve Smart – Mastering Engineer

1992 albums
Flash and the Pan albums